Mirchi is a fine dining restaurant chain, that features modern takes on traditional Indian cuisine based in Dubai, UAE.

History

Mirchi was founded in 2006 by Iftekhar Alam Khan, Mirchi opened their first restaurant in Uptown Mirdif Mall in Dubai, Mirchi features global cuisine influenced by the Indian diaspora.

In 2007, Mirchi opened a branch in Bur Dubai followed by their branch in Academic City, and then Mirchi Express in Wafi Mall.

In 2015, Mirchi opened their largest restaurant in Oud Metha with a capacity of 600 people. It was launched in March 2015.

Branches

Awards

2009 Best Service Performance Outlet by the Department of Economic Development (Dubai).
 2010 Dubai Quality Award winners by Dubai Service Excellence Scheme in Best Service Performance Outlet category.

References

External links
 

Restaurant chains in the United Arab Emirates
Restaurants in Dubai
Indian diaspora in the United Arab Emirates
Indian restaurants outside India